Akhri Shehzada is a 1993 Punjabi action film. The film is directed by M. Aslam, who has also produced films including Khan Bahadur (1994) and Gujjar Badshah (1994).

Cast 
 Sultan Rahi
 Saima Noor
 Tanzeem Hasaan
 Afzal Khan
 Zahir Shah
 Humayun Qureshi
 Adeeb
 Tariq Shah
 Asam Bukhari

Release 
Akri Shahzada was released on 31 December 1993.

Music 
The music of the film was composed by Zulfiqar Ali. The film songs were written by Saleem Murad  and sung by Noor Jehan.

References

External links

 Akhri Shehzada (1993)

Pakistani action films
Punjabi-language Pakistani films
1993 films
1990s Punjabi-language films